Cody William Miller (born January 9, 1992) is an American competitive swimmer. He is a former world record holder in both the men's 4×50 meter freestyle relay and the mixed 4×50 meter freestyle relay as well as a former American record holder in the long course 100 meter breaststroke and short course 50 meter, 100 meter, and 200 meter breaststroke events. At the 2016 Summer Olympics, he won a bronze medal in the 100 meter breaststroke and a gold medal in the 4×100 meter medley relay, swimming the breaststroke leg of the relay in the final to help achieve a new Olympic record. In 2019, he won the silver medal in the 100 meter breaststroke at the year's Pan American Games. He competes representing DC Trident in the International Swimming League.

Miller has won a total of seven medals at World Championships and Olympic Games: three gold medals, two silver medals, and two bronze medals, spanning long and short course pool formats.

Background
Cody Miller was born January 9, 1992, in Billings, Montana. He attended Palo Verde High School in Las Vegas, Nevada. Miller then swam at Indiana University under head coach Ray Looze. When Miller qualified for the U.S. Olympic team in 2016, he was the first swimmer from Indiana University to make the U.S. Olympic team in 40 years. Miller has a younger sister, Catie, who swam for Duke University and was also a breaststroke/IM swimmer from 2014 to 2018. Prior to swimming at Indiana University, Miller swam for the Sandpipers of Nevada.

Miller has pectus excavatum, a deformity of the thoracic wall which causes the chest to cave in due to the sternum and rib cage growing abnormally. In Miller's particular case, his deformity is severe enough to cause limitations to his lung capacity. As a result of having the deformity, he started swimming at age eight "to monitor [his] heart and breathing". Miller opted not to have surgery to correct the deformity, and swimming helped broaden his chest and develop his rib cage.

Miller is a self professed film-buff. He is also recognized through his YouTube channel which he set up in 2016, and has gained in popularity since. He creates content based on his personal life and swimming career. As of June 2022, the channel had grown to over 172,000 subscribers and videos uploaded to the channel had received over 30,000,000 views.

Swimming career

2008–2015
At the 2008 US Olympic Trials in Omaha, Nebraska, Miller placed 76th in the 200 meter individual medley with a time of 2:08.43. The following Olympic Trials, the 2012 US Olympic Trials, Miller placed highest in the 200 meter individual medley where he swam a 2:00.90 to place seventh in the final, finishing 1.03 seconds behind fifth-place finisher Chase Kalisz, as well as placing 14th in the 200 meter breaststroke with a 2:13.43 and 44th in the 100 meter breaststroke with a 1:03.36.

Miller rose to prominence in the world swimming scene at the 2014 Short Course World Championships in Doha, Qatar, where he took home a pair of medals, a silver in the men's 4×100 meter medley relay (3:21.49) and a bronze in the 4×50 m medley relay (an American-record time of 1:31.83).

At the 2014 U.S. nationals, Cody Miller won the 100 breast and claimed his first national title. This win gained him popularity and earned him a sponsorship from the swimwear company TYR. He was sponsored by TYR from 2014 to 2021.

At the 2015 World Aquatics Championships in Kazan, Russia, Miller claimed his first gold medal as part of the U.S. team in the 4×100 meter medley relay. Swimming the breaststroke leg, Miller recorded a split of 59.23 seconds in the prelims to put the Americans at the top of the final field with a time of 3:31.06. Miller also competed in the 100 m breaststroke, but failed to advance to the final, finishing in ninth at 59.86 seconds.

2016–2021
Miller placed second at the 2016 United States Olympic Trials in the 100 meter breaststroke with a time of 59.26 seconds in the final, finishing 0.08 seconds behind first-place finisher Kevin Cordes.

At the 2016 Summer Olympics, Miller won a bronze medal in the men's 100 metre breaststroke, setting the Americas record and American record for the men's 100 metre breaststroke with a time of 58.87 seconds. His time broke the former records of 58.94 seconds set by Kevin Cordes at the 2016 US Olympic Trials. Miller also won a gold medal in the men's 4 × 100 metre medley relay, in which he split a 59.03 for the breaststroke leg of the relay in the final to help win in an Olympic record time of 3:27.95 with finals relay teammates Ryan Murphy (backstroke), Michael Phelps (butterfly), and Nathan Adrian (freestyle).

At the 2019 Pan American Games in Lima, Peru, Miller won the silver medal in the 100 meter breaststroke with a time of 59.57 seconds, finishing 0.06 seconds behind gold medalist João Gomes Júnior of Brazil and 0.70 seconds ahead of bronze medalist Kevin Cordes.

In preparation for the 2020 U.S Olympic Trials, with the primary meet set to be held from June 13–20, Miller signed with Speedo after being with TYR for over 6 years.  He did not qualify for the games.

International championships

 Miller swam only in the prelims heats.

Career best times

Long course meters (50 m pool) 

Legend: b — b-final

Short course meters (25 m pool)

Short course yards (25 yd pool)

World records

Short course meters (25 m pool)

 Miller swam the breaststroke leg; with James Wells (backstroke), Gia Dalesandro (butterfly), and Olivia Barker (freestyle).
 Miller swam the 4th leg; with Bailey Pressey (1st leg), Stephanie Armstrong (2nd leg), and Tanner Kurz (3rd leg).
 Miller swam the 1st leg; with James Wells (2nd leg), Matt Gerth (3rd leg), and Philip Butler (4th leg).

Olympic records

 Miller split a 59.03 for the breaststroke leg; with Ryan Murphy (backstroke), Michael Phelps (butterfly), and Nathan Adrian (freestyle).

Continental and national records

Long course meters (50 m pool)

Short course meters (25 m pool)

Personal life
Cody Miller became engaged to Ali DeWitt on November 22, 2015, at the Golden Goggle Awards. Miller married his fiancée Ali DeWitt on September 9, 2017.  On June 21, 2020, Miller revealed in a video on his YouTube channel that he and his wife Ali were expecting their first child. Their son, Axel Zeke Miller, was born on November 16, 2020. They welcomed their second son Kato William Miller on February 2, 2022.

See also
 World record progression 4 × 50 metres medley relay
 World record progression 4 × 50 metres freestyle relay
 World and Olympic records set at the 2016 Summer Olympics
 List of Pan American Games medalists in swimming

References

External links
 
 
 
 
 
 
 Cody Miller – Indiana University athlete profile at IUHoosiers.com
 BatmansBreastroke – Imgur profile at imgur.com

1992 births
Living people
American male breaststroke swimmers
American YouTubers
World Aquatics Championships medalists in swimming
Indiana Hoosiers men's swimmers
Sportspeople from Billings, Montana
Medalists at the FINA World Swimming Championships (25 m)
Swimmers at the 2016 Summer Olympics
Swimmers at the 2019 Pan American Games
Olympic bronze medalists for the United States in swimming
Medalists at the 2016 Summer Olympics
Olympic gold medalists for the United States in swimming
Pan American Games medalists in swimming
Pan American Games silver medalists for the United States
Palo Verde High School alumni
Medalists at the 2019 Pan American Games